This is a list of lists of albums.

See also
Lists of songs